The University of St. La Salle (USLS) is a Catholic private research university run by the De La Salle Brothers, located in La Salle Avenue, Bacolod, Negros Occidental, Philippines. Established in 1952 as La Salle College - Bacolod, it is the second oldest campus founded by the congregation in the country (first and oldest outside of Manila).  The university is a member of De La Salle Philippines, a network established in 2006 comprising 16 Lasallian educational institutions in the Philippine islands. The university offers preschool, elementary, secondary (junior & senior high), undergraduate, and graduate programs. It has seven colleges namely: Business and Accountancy, Engineering and Technology, Arts and Sciences, Education, Nursing, Law, and Medicine.

History

USLS was founded in 1952 by Br. Dennis Ruhland FSC, Br. Hugh Wester FSC, and Br. V. Felix Masson FSC. La Salle College-Bacolod opened with 175 male students from Prep to Grade 5, under seven faculty members. The school building was unimpressive, built amidst sprawling muddy grounds and bordered by cane fields of adjoining lands.

In the 1960s, La Salle College-Bacolod expanded to provide College-level education. This was made possible through donations by alumni, parents and benefactors. The school became co-educational in 1966.

On July 5, 1988, La Salle College-Bacolod was formally elevated to university status and named University of St. La Salle during rites attended by then secretary of education Lourdes Quisumbing.

It played host to the beach volleyball and boxing events during the 2005 Southeast Asian Games.

Campus 

The school's 10-hectare main campus in La Salle Avenue houses the university's college and graduate school units. The USLS Health Sciences Campus, located at Lacson St., is an additional facility for students under its Nursing and Medicine program.  Its other campus, the 55-hectare Granada Campus, is home to the Agribusiness Farm and the Science Ecological Park, which caters to its Agribusiness students.

Liceo–De La Salle Senior High School 
The Liceo–De La Salle Senior High School is located within the USLS La Salle Avenue (main) campus and offers grades 11 and 12. The senior high school program started in 2016 in compliance with the K-12 program of the national government.

Integrated School Campuses 

The university allotted PHP200 million for the construction of a new campus for the Integrated School in Brgy. Mandalagan with lot donated by the Alunan family. The original Integrated School in the Montelibano campus, which had about 2,000 I.S. students, was already congested. The new campus features two four-storey buildings and can accommodate up to 4,000 students. Construction of the first phase was completed in 2015.

Patron saint

As a Catholic University, the university's patron saint is St. John Baptist de La Salle, a French priest, educational reformer, and founder of an international educational movement who spent over forty years of his life to educate poor children.

Academics
USLS offers preschool, elementary, secondary, undergraduate and graduate level programs. La Salle offers academic programs under Business, Law, the Social Sciences, Psychology, Medicine, Biology, Chemistry, Computer Science, Engineering, Nursing, Education, and Hospitality Management. La Salle has seven Academic colleges, namely College of Nursing, College of Arts and Sciences, Yu An Log College of Business and Accountancy, College of Education, College of Law, College of Engineering and Technology, and College of Medicine.

Student life
The Spectrum – official student publication
Kapawa – The Official English Student Publication of USLS Liceo-De La Salle Senior High School
Berdeng Parola - The Official Filipino Publication of USLS Liceo-De La Salle Senior High School
USLS-IS Drumbeaters – Official drumbeaters of the school started in 2008. It is composed of 15 drumbeaters; known for winning the NOPSSCEA drumbeating competition in 2010-2013 and 2015.

Notable alumni
 Rafael Alunan III – former Secretary of the Interior and Local Government 
Grendel Alvarado – Winner, Philippines' Next Top Model
Mercedes Alvares – Deputy Speaker of the House of Representatives of the Philippines
Francis Arnaiz – former basketball player for Barangay Ginebra San Miguel and Toyota Super Corollas in the Philippine Basketball Association
Louie Casas – footballer (Ceres, Azkals)
Alfonso Cusi – Secretary of Energy (Philippines)
Rafael Coscoluella - former Governor of Negros Occidental
Bro. Rolando Ramos Dizon, FSC – De La Salle Brother, Chairman of The Commission on Higher Education (Philippines)
Alvin Elchico – ABS-CBN Broadcast Journalist
Peque Gallaga – film director
 Daniel Lacson Jr. – former Governor of Negros Occidental, former GSIS Chairman, former President of Negros Navigation
 Oscar Hilado – Former Chairman and CEO of Phinma, in 2007 he was listed as the 33rd Richest man in the Philippines
Ronnie Lazaro – actor
Evelio Leonardia – Mayor of Bacolod, former Congressman 
Armin Luistro – De La Salle brother, former Secretary of the Department of Education (Philippines)
Joel P. Navarro – music conductor
Tating Pasilan – footballer, team captain of Green Archers United F.C. in the United Football League (Philippines)
Carlo Piccio – Olympic swimmer
Erik Matti – film director
Jewel May Lobaton – Bb. Pilipinas-Universe, 1998
Monico Puentevella – former congressman, former Bacolod Mayor
Monsour del Rosario – Taekwondo champion, Film and TV actor, and congressman representing the first district of Makati
Vickie Rushton – Mutya ng Pilipinas 2011, Pinoy Big Brother: All In Housemate
Joel Torre – Film and Television actor
Christian Vasquez – Film and Television actor
Tan Yu – Billionaire-philanthropist, in 1997 he was ranked as the 'Richest man in the Philippines' with a net worth of $7 billion 
Jose Maria Zubiri Jr. – Governor of the Province of Bukidnon

Notable faculty and benefactors

Elsa Martinez Coscolluela – Writer, Academic, Won the Palanca Awards twenty times, is included in its Hall of Fame
José Locsin – former Senator and Secretary of Health 
Alfredo Montelibano Sr. – served as the first mayor of Bacolod in 1938, as military governor of Negros Island and Siquijor Island from 1942 to 1945, and as Secretary of National Defense and Interior under President Sergio Osmeña from 1945 to 1946.

Gallery

See also
List of tertiary schools in Bacolod

References

External links
 USLS list of programs offered
 

 
De La Salle Philippines
Educational institutions established in 1952
Universities and colleges in Bacolod
1952 establishments in the Philippines